4x4 beach volleyball competitions at the 2019 World Beach Games in Doha, Qatar were held from October 12 to October 16, 2019. The venue for the competition was located at Katara Beach. A total of eight men's and eight women's teams (each consisting up to 6 athletes) competed in each tournament. This means a total of 96 athletes are scheduled to compete.

Competition schedule

Qualification
Each National Olympic Committee was allowed to enter up to one men's and one women's team in the 4x4 beach volleyball tournaments. The qualification processes for the men's and women's events were similar. The host country was guaranteed an entry in each event. The five spots were awarded to the best FIVB Beach Volleyball World Rankings for each continental federation. 2 more spots were awarded to invitation (wild card) process.

Men's qualification

Women's qualification

Medal summary

Medalists

Participating nations

References

External links
Results book

4x4 beach volleyball
World Beach Games
2019